Road House is an upcoming American action film serving as a remake, or labeled as a "reimagining", of the 1989 film of the same name. Directed by Doug Liman, the screenplay was written by Anthony Bagarozzi, Chuck Mondry, and Sheldon Turner, and stars Jake Gyllenhaal, Daniela Melchior, Conor McGregor, and Billy Magnussen. Joel Silver produces the film, as he did with the original.

Road House is set to be released by Amazon Studios.

Premise
An ex-UFC middleweight fighter ends up working at a roadhouse in the Florida Keys where things are not as they seem.

Cast
 Jake Gyllenhaal as Elwood Dalton
 Daniela Melchior as Ellie
 Billy Magnussen
 Gbemisola Ikumelo
 Lukas Gage
 Hannah Love Lanier
 Travis Van Winkle
 B. K. Cannon
 Arturo Castro
 Dominique Columbus
 Beau Knapp
 Bob Menery
 Conor McGregor
 Joaquim de Almeida
 Darren Barnet
 Kevin Carroll
 J. D. Pardo
 Jay Hieron as Jax Harris

Production
In November 2013, Metro-Goldwyn-Mayer began development on the film with Rob Cohen directing and Michael Stokes writing. In September 2015, Cohen and Stokes had vacated the project while Ronda Rousey was cast in the lead role. Filming was projected to begin sometime the following year. The next month, Nick Cassavetes boarded the film as writer and director. The project was subsequently put on hold until November 2021, when MGM began another attempt, with Jake Gyllenhaal set to star and Doug Liman to direct. The studio prioritized the film despite Gyllenhaal and Liman's commitments to The Covenant and Everest, respectively. A search for a new writer began to revise a previous draft by Anthony Bagarozzi and Chuck Mondry. By August 2022, Sheldon Turner had turned in a rewrite of the script.

The project was officially greenlit in August 2022 by Amazon Studios, which had purchased MGM five months earlier. Daniela Melchior, Billy Magnussen, Conor McGregor, Gbemisola Ikumelo, Lukas Gage, Hannah Love Lanier, Travis Van Winkle, B.K. Cannon, Arturo Castro, Dominique Columbus, Beau Knapp and Bob Menery were added to the cast alongside Gyllenhaal. Joaquim de Almeida, Darren Barnet, Kevin Carroll and J. D. Pardo were added to the cast later in the month.

Filming began in the Dominican Republic on August 23, 2022.

On March 3, 2023, Gyllenhaal shot a scene with former Ultimate Fighting Championship fighter Jay Hieron following the ceremonial weigh-ins for UFC 285 at MGM Grand Garden Arena in Las Vegas, Nevada. The scene was done in front of fans who attended the weigh-ins and included UFC president Dana White, play-by-play announcer Jon Anik and other regular UFC event personnel. A walkout scene with Gyllenhaal was filmed during an intermission in the event.

References

External links

Upcoming films
Action film remakes
Amazon Studios films
American action films
Films directed by Doug Liman
Films produced by Joel Silver
Films set in Florida
Films shot in the Dominican Republic
Metro-Goldwyn-Mayer films
Remakes of American films
Silver Pictures films
Upcoming English-language films